Holly Springs Masonic Lodge is a historic Masonic Lodge located at Holly Springs, Wake County, North Carolina.  It was built about 1852, and is a two-story, Greek Revival influenced frame building with a side gable roof.  It has a one-story, hip roofed front porch. In addition to being a Masonic Lodge, the building also housed a school.

It was listed on the National Register of Historic Places in 2010.

References

External links
Holly Springs Lodge #115

Masonic buildings in North Carolina
Clubhouses on the National Register of Historic Places in North Carolina
Greek Revival architecture in North Carolina
Buildings and structures completed in 1852
Buildings and structures in Wake County, North Carolina
National Register of Historic Places in Wake County, North Carolina
1852 establishments in North Carolina